This is a list of women writers who were born in Ireland or whose writings are closely associated with that country.

A
Mary Jane Adams (1840–1902), Irish-American poet 
Cecil Frances Alexander (1818–1895), Anglo-Irish hymn writer and poet
Eleanor Jane Alexander (1857–1939), poet and novelist
Deborah Alcock (1835–1913), historical novelist, memoirist
Cecelia Ahern (born 1981), novelist, short story writer
Liz Allen (born 1969), investigative journalist, best selling novelist
Colette Nic Aodha (born 1967), poet
Karen Ardiff, Irish playwright and novelist

Geraldine Aron (born 1951), playwright 
Mary Arrigan (born 15 February 1943),  illustrator, artist and novelist
Sarah Atkinson (1823–1893), biographer, essayist, philanthropist

B
Mary Barber (c.1685–c.1755), successful poet, author of Poems on several occasions
Leland Bardwell (1928–2016), poet, novelist, playwright
Alex Barclay, pseudonym of Yve Williams, (born 1974), journalist and crime writer
Jane Barlow (1857–1917), poet, novelist
Margaret Barrington (1896–1982), short story writer, essayist
Samantha Barry (born c.1981), journalist, editor
Eileen Battersby (c.1958–2018), literary critic
Henrietta Battier (c.1751–1813), poet, satirist, actress
Sara Baume (born 1984), novelist
Annie O'Meara de Vic Beamish, (1886–1969), novelist, playwright, translator
Louisa Beaufort (1781–1863), antiquarian, writer and artist
Emily Elizabeth Shaw Beavan, (1818–1897), poet
Mary Beckett (1926–2013), playwright for radio, short story writer, children's writer
Louie Bennett (1870–1956), suffragette, journalist and novelist
Tara Bergin (born 1974), poet
Sara Berkeley (born 1967), poet
Maeve Binchy (1939–2012), novelist, playwright, short story writer, columnist
E. Owens Blackburne (1848–1894), pen name writer and novelist, Elizabeth Casey
Marguerite Gardiner, Countess of Blessington (1789–1849), novelist, essayist, letter writer
Gertrude Elizabeth Blood (1857–1911), journalist, writer, playwright and editor
Eavan Boland (1944–2020), poet, non-fiction writer
Angela Bourke (born 1952), writer, historian, interested in folklore
Eva Bourke, German-born Irish poet since c.1985
Elizabeth Bowen (1899–1973), novelist, short story writer, author of Eva Trout
Sarah Bowie, Irish illustrator and writer
Clare Boylan (1948–2006), journalist, critic, novelist, short story writer 
Hilary Boyle (1899–1988), journalist, broadcaster, and activist
Éilís Ní Bhrádaigh (1927–2007), writer and lexicographer 

Maeve Brennan (1917–1993), short story writer, journalist, from 1934 in the United States
Sarah Rees Brennan (born 1983), young adult novelist
Máire Bradshaw (born 1943), poet and publisher
Teresa Brayton (1868–1943), poet, contributed to American newspapers
Charlotte Brooke (c.1740–1793), writer, translator of Irish-language poetry
Mary Brück (1925–2008), astronomer, science historian
Catherine Dorothea Burdett (1784–1861), novelist
Patricia Burke Brogan (fl. 1990s), playwright and poet
Charlotte Brooke (c.1740–1793), poet, author of Reliques of Irish Poetry
Mary Bonaventure Browne (17th century), nun, abbess, historian
Frances Browne (1816–1879), poet, novelist, children's writer
Colette Bryce (born 1970), poet
Ann Buckley (fl. 1990s), musicologist, non-fiction writer
Selina Bunbury (1802–1882), prolific novelist
Anne Burke (fl.1780–1805), was an Irish novelist in the Gothic genre
Patricia Burke Brogan (born c.1934), playwright, novelist, poet, artist
Catherine Byron (born 1947), poet

C
June Caldwell (born c. 1970), journalist, short story writer
Margaret Callan (c. 1817–c. 1883), teacher, nationalist, writer, used the pseudonym Thornton MacMahon
Caitilin Dubh (fl. c. 1624), early poet, wrote elegies
Moya Cannon (born 1956), poet, journal editor
Ethna Carbery (1866–1902), poet, journalist, short story writer 
Mary Birkett Card (1774–1817), Abolitionist and feminist poet
Amy Carmichael (1867–1951), missionary, many works on her work in India
Orlaith Carmody (born 1960), businesswoman, writer and news reporter
Marina Carr (born 1964), playwright
Austin Carroll (1835–1909), nun and writer, emigrated to United States
Claudia Carroll (born c. 1969), best-selling author
Anne-Marie Casey (born 1965), screenwriter, novelist
Agnes Castle (c.1860–1922), novelist, playwright and short story writer
Anne Chambers, since 2007, novelist, screenwriter, biographer
Maureen Charlton (1930–2007), playwright, poet and broadcaster
Anna Maria Chetwode (fl. 1827), novelist
Lana Citron (born 1969) writer
Josephine Fitzgerald Clarke (1865–1953), Irish romance novelist
Maude Clarke (1892–1935), historian
Agnes Mary Clerke (1842–1907), astronomer, writer
Eliza Dorothea Cobbe, Lady Tuite (c. 1764–1850), poet and children's writer
Frances Power Cobbe (1822–1904), writer and suffragist
Patricia Cockburn (1914–1989), journalist and artist
Mary Colum (1884–1957), literary critic, memoirist
Helena Concannon (1878–1952), historian, non-fiction writer, politician 
Evelyn Conlon (born 1952), novelist, short story writer
Marita Conlon-McKenna (born 1956), children's writer, author of Under the Hawthorn Tree
Susan E. Connolly (c. 1970), fiction and non fiction writer
June Considine (born 1945), children's writer and novelist
Dorothea Conyers (1869–1949), romantic novelist
Melosina Lenox-Conyngham (1941–2011), columnist and writer
Roz Cowman (born 1942), poet
Mary Costello (fl. 2010s), short story writer, novelist
Ethna Byrne-Costigan (1904–1991) writer and academic
Emily Crawford (1841–1915), journalist
Mabel Sharman Crawford (1820–1912), an Irish adventurer, feminist and writer
Isabella Valancy Crawford (1846–1887), Irish-born Canadian poet, short story writer, novelist
Máirín Cregan (1891–1975), nationalist and writer
Elizabeth Christitch (1861–January 26, 1933)  Irish journalist, writer, poet, translator and Serbian patriot
Bithia Mary Croker (1848–1920), novelist
May Crommelin (1850–1930), novelist, travel writer
Sarah Crossan (fl. 2010s), young adult writer
Julia Crottie (1853–about 1930), novelist and short story writer
Catherine Ann Cullen, Irish poet
Majella Cullinane (fl. 2010s), novelist, poet, now in New Zealand
Geraldine Cummins (1890–1969), spiritualist, novelist and playwright
Judi Curtin, Irish children's writer
Margaret Anna Cusack (1829–1899), nun, novelist, biographer, non-fiction writer, poet
Sidney Czira (1889–1974), journalist, broadcaster, writer and revolutionary

D
Emma Dabiri author, academic, and broadcaster

Ita Daly (born 1945), novelist and short story writer
Mary E. Daly (fl. 1980s), historian
Mildred Darby (1867–1932), novelist
Ailbhe Darcy (born 1981), poet
Suzanne R. Day (1876–1964), feminist, playwright and novelist
Mildred Darby (1867–1932), Gothic novelist and owner of Leap Castle
Annabel Davis-Goff (born 1942), memoirist, novelist, reviewer, now in the United States
Mary Davys (1674–1732), novelist, playwright, author of The Reform'd Coquet
Suzanne R. Day (1876–1964), feminist, novelist and playwright
Alice Dease (1874–1949), novelist
Charlotte Dease (1873–1953), prayer collector and writer
Denise Deegan (born 1966), screenwriter and young adult writer
Teresa Deevy (1894–1963), playwright, short story writer, also wrote for radio
Martina Devlin, award-winning columnist and best selling novelist
Polly Devlin (born 1944), novelist, short story writer, broadcaster
Éilís Ní Dhuibhne (born 1954), novelist, short story writer, children's writer, playwright, writes in Irish and English
Máirín Diamond (born 1957), poet
Eilís Dillon (1920–1994), children's writer, historical novelist, wrote in Irish and English
Lady Margaret Domville (1840–9 January 1929), Irish aristocrat and writer
Emma Donoghue (born 1969), playwright, historian, novelist, now living in Canada, author of Room
Aoife Dooley (born 1991), writer, illustrator and graphic designer
Mary Dorcey (born 1950), short story writer, poet, novelist
Ellen Mary Patrick Downing, poet
Mary Downing (c. 1815–1881), poet and nationalist
Catharine Drew (1832–1910), journalist
Nora Dryhurst (1856–1930), nationalist and writer
Dorothea Du Bois (1728–1774), musical entertainment writer
Ruth Dudley Edwards (born 1944), crime fiction novelist, journalist, broadcaster
Bella Duffy, (1849–1926), writer and translator

E
Charlotte O'Conor Eccles (1860–1911), novelist, short story writer, columnist 
Frances Anne Edgeworth (1769–1865), memoirist, botanical artist
Maria Edgeworth (1768–1849), novelist, children's writer, author of The Purple Jar
George Egerton, pen name of Mary Chavelita Dunne Bright (1859–1945), short story writer, novelist, playwright, translator
Olivia Elder (1735–1780), poet
Marianne Elliott (born 1948), historian
Anne Enright (born 1962), essayist, short story writer, novelist, non-fiction writer
Erminda Rentoul Esler (c. 1852–1924), novelist, short story writer
Elsa d'Esterre-Keeling (1857–1935), novelist
Martina Evans (born 1961), poet and novelist

F
Elaine Feeney (born 1979), poet
Mrs. E. M. Field(1856–1940), children and historical
N. P. Figgis (1939–2014), archaeologist and author 
Sarah Mary Fitton (c. 1796–1874), writer interested in botany
Barbara Fitzgerald (1911–1982), novelist
Kitty Fitzgerald (born September 25, 1946), writer, poet, playwright
Theodora FitzGibbon (1916–1991), cookbook writer, novelist, actress
Marie-Louise Fitzpatrick (born 1962), novelist, children's writer, illustrator
Patricia Forde (born c. 1960), children's writer
Anne Marie Forrest (born 1967), widely translated novelist
Ellen Forrester (1828–1883), nationalist and poet
Lydia Mary Foster (1867–1943), writer and novelist
Lorraine Francis (born 1958), children's writer
M. E. Francis (1859–1930), novelist
Celia de Fréine (born 1948), poet, playwright, screenwriter, librettist, writing in Irish and English 
Katy French (1983–2007), model, television personality, columnist
Tana French (born 1973), novelist, actress, author of In the Woods
Sarah Mary Fitton (c. 1796–1874), botanist, non-fiction writer, children's writer
Anne Fuller (died 1790), novelist in the Gothic genre
Alice Furlong (1866–1946), poet, feminist, wrote in English and Irish

G
Gertrude Gaffney (died 1959), journalist
Maureen Gaffney (born 1947), psychologist, non-fiction writer
Margaret Gallagher (fl. 1970s), writer specializing in gender and media
Miriam Gallagher (born 1940), plays, scripts, books, stories
Evie Gaughan (born 1976), writer and artist
Ruth Gilligan (born 1988), best selling novelist
Dr. Maude Glasgow (1876–1955), early pioneer in public health and preventative medicine as well as an activist for equal rights.
Lady Blanche Girouard (1898–1940), writer
Eva Gore-Booth (1870–1926), poet, playwright, feminist
Clotilde Graves (1863–1932), novelist and playwright
Ida Margaret Graves Poore (1859–1941), writer and poet
Áine Greaney (c. 1962), writer and editor
Alice Stopford Green (1847–1929), historian and nationalist
Sarah Green (fl.1790–1825), Irish-English novelist
Augusta, Lady Gregory (1852–1932), playwright, folk story writer, poet, memoirist, travelled widely
Frances Greville (c 1724–1789), poet, social celebrity
Constantia Grierson (c.1705–1732), editor, poet, classical scholar
Sarah Maria Griffin (born c. 1988), Irish writer and poet
Elizabeth Griffith (1727–1793), playwright, novelist, essayist, translator
Beatrice Grimshaw (1870–1953), novelist, travel writer
Vona Groarke (born 1964), poet
Isabel Grubb (1881–1972), historian
Veronica Guerin (1958–1996), journalist
Althea Gyles (1868–1949), poet, artist

H
Anna Maria Hall (1800–1881), playwright, novelist, short story writerist
C. J. Hamilton, (1841–1935) novelist and journalist
Marianne-Caroline Hamilton (1777–1861), artist and memoirist
Emma Hannigan (1972–2018), novelist, memoirist
Kerry Hardie (born 1951), poet and novelist
Elizabeth Hardy (1794–1854), novelist
Nancy Harris, successful playwright since c. 2012
Anne Le Marquand Hartigan (born 1940s), poet, playwright, painter
Johanna Harwood (born 1930), screenwriter
Anne Haverty (born 1959), novelist and poet
Mary Hayden (1862–1942), historian, Irish-language and women's rights activist
Annie French Hector, 'Mrs. Alexander' (1825–1902), popular novelist
Barbara Hemphill (died 1858), novelist
Claire Hennessy (born 1986), young adult novelist
Dorothea Herbert (c. 1767–1829), diarist, poet
Marie Herbert (born 1941), adventurer and author
Sarah Herbert (1824–1846), Irish-Nova Scotian author, publisher and educator
Jane Emily Herbert (1821–1882), acclaimed poet 
Emily Henrietta Hickey (1845–1923), poet, writer on religion, translator
Elizabeth Hickey (1917–1999), historian
Mary Agnes Hickson (1821–1899), historian
F. E. Higgins, pen name of Fiona Higgins, novelist since 2007
Rita Ann Higgins (born 1955), poet, playwright
Pamela Hinkson (1900–1982), novelist
Mary Hobhouse (1864–1901), poet, novelist
Mary Anne Holmes (1773–1805), poet
Norah Hoult (1898–1984), novelist and short story writer
Caoilinn Hughes (fl. 2010s), novelist, short story writer
Margaret Wolfe Hungerford (1855–1897), popular novelist, short story writer
Arlene Hunt (born 1972), crime fiction novelist

J
Rosamund Jacob (1888–1960), diarist, novelist
Anna Brownell Jameson (1794–1860), Irish-born British non-fiction writer, essayist
Biddy Jenkinson (born 1949), Irish-language poet, short story writer and dramatist
Rosemary Jenkinson (born 1967), poet, playwright and short story writer
Jennifer Johnston (born 1930), novelist, author of How Many Miles to Babylon?
Lauren-Shannon Jones (born c. 1989), horror playwright and performer
Kate Jordan (1862–1926), Irish-American novelist and playwright
Ann Henning Jocelyn (born 1948), writer, playwright and translator

K
Julia Kavanagh (1824–1877), children's writer, novelist, stories mainly based in France
Rose Kavanagh (1860–1891), newspaper editor, columnist, poet
Úna-Minh Kavanagh (born 1991), journalist, travel writer
Anna Kelly (1891–1958), journalist and the first women's page editor in Ireland
Molly Keane (1904–1996), novelist and playwright
Cathy Kelly (born 1966), journalist, widely translated women's fiction novelist
Maeve Kelly (born 1930), novelist, short story writer, poet
Mary Eva Kelly (1826–1910), poet, emigrated to Australia
Rita Kelly (born 1953), poet, writing in Irish and English
Sonya Kelly playwright
Mary Olivia Kennedy (1880–1943), journalist
Marian Keyes (born 1963), successful novelist, non-fiction writer, works widely translated
Molly Keane (1904–1996), novelist, playwright
Paula Keane (born 1977), novelist and short story writer
Celine Kiernan (born 1967), young adult novelist, children's writer
Carla King (fl. 2000s), historian
Margaret King (1773–1835), children's writer, non-fiction works
Elaine Kinsella (fl. 2000s), radio dramatist
Olivia Knight (1830–1908), poet, essayist, columnist, from 1860 in to Australia
Kathleen Knox (1847–1930), Irish author and poet who used the pen name Edward Kane in later life

L
May Laffan (1849–1916), novelist
Margaret Rebecca Lahee (1831–1895), Irish Lancashire dialect writer from the 19th century
Caitriona Lally (fl. 2018), novelist
Elish Lamont (c.1800–1870), artist, writer and poet
Lathóg of Tír Chonaill (9th century), poet
Rosamond Langbridge (1880–1964), novelist, playwright, poet 
Maura Laverty (1907–1966), novelist, short story writer, journalist, broadcaster
Mary Lavin (1912–1996), pioneering novelist, short story writer
Emily Lawless (1845–1913), novelist, poet, biographer, historian
Alice Lawrenson (1841–1900), gardener
Sybil le Brocquy (1892–1973), playwright and conservationist
Mary Leadbeater (1758–1826), poet, short story writer, biographer, letter writer
Ada Leask (1899–1987), historian
Alicia Sheridan Le Fanu (1753–1817), playwright, published only one play: The Sons of Erin; Or, Modern Sentiment
Sarah Leech (1809–1830), poet 
Alicia LeFanu (1791–1867), poet, novelist 
Elizabeth Emmet Lenox-Conyngham (1800–1889), poet
Mae Leonard poet, broadcaster, short story writer
Mary Isabel Leslie (1899–1978), known as Temple Lane, novelist
Sybil le Brocquy (1892–1973) 
June Levine (1931–2008), journalist, novelist, feminist writer
Liadain (7th century), poet
J.S. Anna Liddiard (1773–1819), romantic poet
Ruth Frances Long (born 1971), novelist, young adult writer
Hannah Lynch (1859–1904), Irish novelist, journalist and translator
Patricia Lynch (1894–1972), children's writer, journalist, short story writer
Philomena Lynott (1930–2019), memoirist
Genevieve Lyons (1930–2018), actress, novelist, educator
Constance Lloyd (1858 – 1898), wife of Oscar Wilde, suffragist, journalist, playwright, and a dress reform activist

M
Catherine Maberly (1805–1875) Irish writer
Aifric Mac Aodha (born 1979), poet
Dorothy Macardle (1889–1958), novelist, playwright, historian
Bridget G. MacCarthy (1904–1993), literary historian
Ethna MacCarthy (1903–1959), poet
Mary Stanislaus MacCarthy (1849–1897), nun, poet
Doireann MacDermott (born 1923), translator, philologist, non-fiction writer
Marisa Mackle (born c.1973), novelist
Eleanor MacMahon (1864–1956), romance novelist
Kathleen MacMahon, journalist and novelist
Charlotte Elizabeth MacManus (1850–1941), novelist
Máire MacNeill (1904–1987), journalist, folklorist, translator
Catherine Mary MacSorley (1848–1929), children's writer for girls, religious works
Marie MacSweeney, poet, shortstories
Máire MacSwiney Brugha (1918–2012), activist and writer
Audrey Magee (active since 2000), novelist
Bríd Mahon (1922–2008), novelist and folklorist
Catherine Gray, Lady Manners (1766–1852), poet
Mary Manning (1905–1999), novelist, playwright and film critic
Alicia Catherine Mant (1788–1869), children's writer
Harriet Evans Martin (died 1846), Anglo-Irish novelist, non-fiction writer
Harriet Letitia Martin (1801–1891), novelist
Mary Letitia Martin (1815–1850), novelist
Violet Florence Martin (1862–1915), novelist, co-authored works with Edith Somerville
Mary Mathew (1724–1777), diarist
Caitlín Maude (1941–1982), poet, teacher, actress, singer, wrote in Irish 
Constantia Maxwell (1886–1962), historian
Joan McBreen (born 1947), poet
Eimear McBride (born 1976), novelist, author of A Girl Is a Half-formed Thing
Kate McCabe (fl. 2005), novelist
Felicity McCall, journalist, playwright since c.2004
Nell McCafferty (born 1944), journalist, playwright, feminist
Justine McCarthy (fl. 2000s), journalist
Mary McCarthy (1951–2013), successful novelist
Letitia McClintock (1835–1917), writer and folklorist
Jenny McCudden, since c.2010, journalist, short story writer, poet
Mary McDermott (fl. 1832), poet
Mary McDonagh (born 1849), poet
Rosaleen McDonagh (fl. 2000s), activist and playwright
Medbh McGuckian (born 1950), Northern-Irish poet, literary writer
Maura McHugh (fl. 2000s), writer of horror novels, plays, comic books and short stories
Lisa McInerney (born 1981), novelist, short story writer, blogger
Pauline McLynn (born 1962), actress, novelist
Liz McManus (born 1947), politician, novelist
Janet McNeill (1907–1994), novelist, playwright and children's writer
Anna McPartlin (born 1972), novelist
Dervla McTiernan (born c.1977), crime novelist  
L. T. Meade, pen name of Elizabeth Thomasina Meade Smith (1844–1914), prolific young adult and children's writer, mainly for girls, wrote over 300 books
Norah Meade (1888–1954), journalist
Roisin Meaney, Irish novelist
A. Garland Mears (1842–1920), novelist
Paula Meehan (born 1955), poet, playwright
Máighréad Medbh (born 1959), poet
A. L. Mentxaka (active since 2000s), playwright, critic, educator
Máire Mhac an tSaoi (1922–2021), acclaimed Irish-language scholar, poet, translator
Betty Miller (1910–1965), novelist, non-fiction writer, biographer, columnist
Alice Milligan (1865–1953), acclaimed poet
Anna Millikin (fl. 1793–1810) Gothic novelist
Lia Mills (fl. 1990s), novelist, short story writer
Susan L. Mitchell (1866–1926), poet, known for her satirical verse
Dorothy Molloy (1942–2004), poet, journalist and artist
Frances Molloy (1947–1991), novelist
Mary Monck (c. 1677–1715), poet
Sydney, Lady Morgan (1781–1859), poet, novelist, author of The Wild Irish Girl
Sinead Moriarty (born c. 1971), novelist
Sinéad Morrissey (born 1972), poet
Kathleen Mulchrone (1895–1973), Irish Celtic scholar, writer
Rosa Mulholland (1841–1921), prolific novelist, poet, playwright, biographer
Val Mulkerns (1925–2018)), novelist, journalist, columnist, broadcaster
Sheila Mulloy (1922–2013), historian
Margaret Mulvihill (born 1954), novelist and non-fiction writer
Iris Murdoch (1919–1999), Irish-born successful British novelist, philosopher, author of Under the Net
Agnes G. Murphy (1865–1931), Irish journalist and writer
C.E. Murphy (born 1973), American-born writer living in Ireland, writing using Irish mythology
Dervla Murphy (1931–2022), touring cyclist, travel writer
Elaine Murphy, playwright since c. 2008
Kathleen M. Murphy (died 1963), poet
Maura Murphy (1928–2005), autobiographer
Nora J Murray (1888–1955), poet, short story writer, school teacher

N
Angela Nagle (born 1984), non-fiction writer
Mary Nash (born 1947), historian
Kate Newmann (born 1965), poet and small press founder
Cláir Ní Aonghusa (born 1953), novelist, poet
Eibhlín Ní Bhriain (1925–1986), Irish-language journalist
Síle Ní Chéileachair (1924–1985), Irish-language short story writer
Dairena Ní Chinnéide (born 1969), poet and short story writer
Caitríona Ní Chléirchín (fl. 2010), poet
Eibhlín Dubh Ní Chonaill (c. 1743–c. 1800), poet, lament in Irish
Nuala Ní Chonchúir (born 1970), novelist, poet
Eiléan Ní Chuilleanáin (born 1942), poet, non-fiction writer
Annemarie Ní Churreáin (fl. 2010s), poet
Nuala Ní Dhomhnaill (born 1952), poet, writing in Irish
Máire Ní Dhonnchadha Dhuibh (c. 1702–c. 1795), poet
Éilís Ní Dhuibhne (born 1954), novelist and short story writer in Irish and English
Ciara Ní É bilingual Irish poet, writer and television presenter
Ailbhe Ní Ghearbhuigh (born 1984), poet, writing in Irish
Áine Ní Ghlinn (born 1955), poet, children's writer, writing in Irish
Máiréad Ní Ghráda (1896–1971), poet, playwright, broadcaster
Doireann Ní Ghríofa (born 1981), poet writing in Irish and English
Sorcha Ní Ghuairim (1911–1976), columnist, newspaper editor, teacher
Máire Bhuí Ní Laoghaire (1774–1849), poet in the oral tradition
Bríd Ní Mhóráin (born 1951), poet
Ailís Ní Ríain (fl. 2000s), composer and playwright
Siobhán Ní Shúilleabháin (1928–2013), dramatist, novelist and children's writer
Colette Nic Aodha (born 1967), Irish-language poet
Nuala Níc Con Iomaire (died 2010), playwright
Sister Nivedita (1867–1911), nun, essayist, non-fiction writer especially on India
Ellen Kyle Noel (1815–1873), Irish writer who published a number of novels through journals and serialization
Liz Nugent (born 1967), novelist

O
Margaret Ó hÓgartaigh (1967–2014), historian
Kathy O'Beirne (1956–2019), non-fiction writer
Kathleen O'Brennan (1876–1948), activist, journalist and playwright
Lily O'Brennan (1878–1948), writer and playwright
Charlotte Grace O'Brien (1845–1909), novelist, essayist, non-fiction writer and nationalist
Edna O'Brien (born 1930), novelist, memoirist, playwright, poet, short story writer
Eileen O'Brien (1925-1986), journalist
Frances O'Brien (1840–1883), poet and novelist
Kate O'Brien (1897–1974), novelist, playwright, travel writer
Mary O'Brien (writer) (fl. 1785–1790), poet and playwright
Helen O'Clery (1910–2006), children's writer 
Ellen Bridget O'Connell (1805–1883), poet
Gemma O'Connor (born 1940), novelist, short story writer
Niamh O'Connor (active since 2000), journalist, novelist
Mary Barry O'Delaney (1862–1947), journalist and nationalist
Mary O'Donnell (born 1954), novelist, poet, short story writer
Mary O'Donoghue (born 1975), novelist, poet, translator
Mary Jane O'Donovan Rossa (1845–1916), poet and political activist
Julia O'Faolain (1932–2020), novelist, short story writer, emigrated to the United States
Nuala O'Faolain (1940–2008), best selling novelist, journalist, television producer, critic, memoirist
Ursula O'Farrell (born 1934), non-fiction writer on counseling
Sheila O'Hagan, poet since 1984
Adelaide O'Keeffe (1776–1865), poet and novelist
Nessa O'Mahony (fl. 1990s), poet
Mary O'Malley (born 1954), poet 
Kathleen O'Meara (1839–1888), journalist, novelist, biographer
Louise O'Neill (born 1985), novelist, young adult writer
Mary Devenport O'Neill (1879–1967), modernist poet, playwright 
Geraldine O'Neill (born c. 1950s), historical novelist
Moira O'Neill, pen name of Agnes Shakespeare Higginson (1864–1955), popular Irish-Canadian poet
Caitriona O'Reilly (born 1973), poet, critic
Emily O'Reilly (fl. 1970s), journalist, non-fiction writer, ombudsman
Pat O'Shea (1931–2007), children's writer
Leanne O'Sullivan (fl. 2004), poet
Maureen Donovan O'Sullivan (1887–1966), educator, journal editor, historian
Suzanne O'Sullivan (fl. 2010s), non-fiction writer
Jane Ohlmeyer (fl. 1990s), historian
Adela Orpen (1855–1927), essay writer and novelist
Annette Jocelyn Otway-Ruthven (1909–1989), historian and early female academic
Olivia Owenson, Lady Clarke (1785–1845), poet and dramatist

P
Siobhán Parkinson (born 1954), children's writer, novelist, non-fiction writer, translator, writes in English and Irish
Fanny Parnell (1848–1882), poet, known as the Patriot Poet
Julie Parsons (born 1951), novelist
Mrs F. C. Patrick, 18th-century Gothic novelist
Mabel Cosgrove Wodehouse Pearse (born 1872), novelist
Margaret Pender (1848–1920), Irish writer and poet
Ethel Penrose (1857–1938), Irish children's writer
Amelia Perrier (1841–1875), Irish novelist and travel writer
Alice Perry (1885–1969), poet, feminist and early engineering graduate
Daphne Pochin Mould, 20th-century historian, pilot, broadcaster and writer
Madeleine A. Polland (1918–2005), children's author
Nannie Lambert Power O'Donoghue, (1843–1940), poet, journalist, novelist, social activist
Mabel Cosgrove Wodehouse Pearse (born 1872), novelist
Nicola Pierce (born 1969), Irish writer and ghost writer
Laetitia Pilkington (c. 1709–1750), poet, memoirist
Louisa Lilias Plunket Greene (1833–1891), children's writer
Máire Wyse Power (1887–1916), Irish Celtic scholar
Stefanie Preissner (born 1988), dramatist, screenwriter, actress
Katherine Arnold Price (1893–1989), poet and writer

Deirdre Purcell (born 1945), journalist, novelist, non-fiction writer, actress
Katherine Purdon (1852–1920), writer

Q
Marjorie Quarton (born 1930), children's writer, novelist

R
Sophie Raffalovich (1860–1960), Irish nationalist and writer
Orlaith Rafter (fl. 1990s), actress and playwright
Mary Raftery (1957–2012), investigative journalist, filmmaker and writer
Elizabeth Reapy (fl. 2012), editor, novelist
Nell Regan (born 1969), poet and non-fiction writer
Christina Reid (1942–2015), playwright 
Lorna Reynolds (1911–2003), writer, editor and academic
Grace Rhys (1865–1929), novelist, essayist, poet, children's writer
Jessie Louisa Rickard (1876–1963), popular novelist
Charlotte Riddell (1832–1906), influential novelist, short story writer, journal editor
Lucinda Riley (1965–2021), novelist, actress
Nesca Robb (1905–1976), poet, non-fiction writer
Anne Isabella Robertson (c.1830–1910), writer and suffragist
Regina Maria Roche (1764–1845), popular novelist, author of The Children of the Abbey
Sally Rooney (born 1991), novelist
Amanda McKittrick Ros (1860–1939), novelist, poet 
Orna Ross (born 1960), novelist, literary agent
Rosemarie Rowley (born 1942), poet
Margot Ruddock (1907–1951), actress, poet
Meda Ryan (fl. 1980s), historian
Roma Ryan, since 1982, poet, lyricist
Elizabeth Ryves (1750–1797), poet, playwright, novelist, journalist, translator

S
Mary Anne Sadlier (1820–1903), Irish-Canadian novelist, short story writer
Blanaid Salkeld (1880–1959), poet, playwright, actress, salonist 
Virginia Sandars (1828–1922), author
Patricia Scanlan (born 1956), novelist
Eileen Shanahan (1901–1979), poet
Elizabeth Shane (1877–1951), poet
Elizabeth Shaw, artist, illustrator and children's writer
Mabel Sharman Crawford (1820–1912), feminist, travel writer
Nessa Ní Shéaghda (1916–1993), Irish Celtic Studies scholar
Eileen Sheehan (born 1963), poet, teacher
Helena Sheehan (fl. 1980s), philosopher, historian and non-fiction writer
Betsy Sheridan (1758–1837), diarist
Frances Sheridan (1724–1766), novelist, playwright
Dora Sigerson Shorter (1866–1918), poet, sculptor
Hester Sigerson Piatt (1870–1939), poet and journalist
Rhoda Cosgrave Sivell (1874–1962), poet
Niamh Sharkey author and illustrator of children’s picturebooks
Sharon Slater (fl. 2010s), historian
Doris E. Smith (1919–before 1994), romantic novelist
Annie M. P. Smithson (1873–1948), novelist and poet
Cherry Smyth (born 1953), academic, poet, writer and art critic
Ciara Elizabeth Smyth (fl. 2010s), playwright
Edith Somerville (1858–1949), novelist in collaboration with her cousin Violet Florence Martin
Eithne Strong (1925–1999), writer and poet, Irish and English languages
Deirdre Sullivan, Irish children's writer and poet
Elinor Sweetman (c. 1861–1922), poet

T
Jemima von Tautphoeus (1807–1893), novelist, focus on Bavaria
Alice Taylor (born 1938), novelist, memoirist, poet and children's writer
Katherine Thurston (1875–1911), novelist, author of The Masquerader
Mary Tighe (1772–1810), poet
Melesina Trench (1768–1827), diarist, letter writer, essayist, poet
Una Troy (1913–1993), novelist, playwright
Eliza Dorothea Cobbe, Lady Tuite (c. 1764–1850), author and poet
Lizzie Twigg (1882–1933), poet
Katharine Tynan (1859–1931), novelist, poet, biographer

V
Noelle Vial (1959–2003), poet
Ethel Lilian Voynich (1864–1960), novelist, author of the successful The Gadfly
Moira Verschoyle (1903–1985)

W
Helen Waddell (1889–1965), poet, translator, playwright
Maureen Wall (1918–1972), historian
Catherine Walsh (born 1964), poet
 Dolores Walshe (born 1949), short story writer, novelist and playwright
Elizabeth Hely Walshe (1835–1869), writer
Maria Webb (1804–1873), philanthropist and historian
Liz Weir (born 1950), storyteller and children's writer
Biddy White Lennon (1946–2017), actress and food writer
Sheila Wingfield (1906–1992), poet
Agnes Romilly White (1872–1945), novelist
Ida L. White (19th century), poet, feminist
Isabella Whiteford Rogerson (1835–1905), poet
Jane Wilde (1821–1896), poet, interested in folk tales
Catherine Wilmot (1773–1824), travel writer, diarist, letter writer
Florence Mary Wilson (c. 1870–1946), poet
Laurie Winkless (fl. 2010s), physicist and science writer
Denyse Woods (born 1958), novelist
Isabella Letitia Woulfe (1817–1870), novelist
Maev-Ann Wren (born 1950s), economist, journalist, newspaper editor, non-fiction writer
Frances Wynne (1863–1893), poet
Grace Wynne-Jones (fl. 1990s), playwright, journalist, writer

Y
Ella Young (1867–1956), poet, Celtic mythologist, children's writer, emigrated to California
Rose Maud Young (1866–1947), diarist, writer

Z
Jo Zebedee (born 1971), writer

See also
List of Irish writers
List of women writers

References

-
Irish women writers, List of
Writers
Women writers, List of Irish